The Klondike Mountain Formation is an Early Eocene (Ypresian) geological formation located in the northeast central area of Washington state. The formation is comprised of volcanic rocks in the upper unit and volcanic plus lacustrine (lakebed) sedimentation in the lower unit. the formation is named for the type location designated in 1962, Klondike Mountain northeast of Republic, Washington. The formation is a lagerstätte with exceptionally well-preserved plant and insect fossils has been found, along with fossil epithermal hot springs.

The Klondike Mountain formation is the youngest in a series of formations which belong to the Challis Sequence volcanics, and is the southernmost of the Eocene Okanagan Highlands paleolake lagerstätten.  The formation unconformably overlies rocks of the Eocene Sanpoil Volcanics and much older Triassic and Permian formations. The formation is bounded on its edges by a series of high-angle strike slip faults, which have contained the Klondike Mountain Formation in a series of graben structures, such as the Republic Graben.  Public access to a fossiliferous outcrop at the north end of Republic is mediated by the nonprofit Stonerose Interpretive Center.

Extent 
The formation is located in northern Ferry County, Washington, with the majority of the sedimentation in the Republic and Curlew Basins on the east and in the Toroda Creek area to the north west.  The town of Republic, Washington is situated at the southern end of the formation, with outcrops within the city itself.  The formation was named for Klondike Mountain which is just to the northeast of the city, and where the type locality is located. The Curlew basin is situated north of Republic, with the northern edge along the Kettle River and the community of Curlew, Washington near the northeastern edge.

The formation is the southernmost of in the string of Eocene highland lakebeds that extend into British Columbia. Closely correlated with and possibly representing the same lake sequence as the Klondike Mountain Formation are the Penticton Group's Kettle River, Marama and Marron Formations in the Boundary District along the Canada-United States border.

Age 
Early dating of the formation was based primarily on identification and correlation of the fossils found in the Tom Thumb Tuff, with Joseph Umpleby (1910) reporting a putative age of Early Miocene. This date was based in examination of fossils by C. R. Eastman, who thought them to be similar to those found in the Florissant Formation of Colorado, which at the time was also considered Miocene. This age was retained by Edward W. Berry (1929), who included the Klondike Mountain Formation fossil lakebeds as part of the Latah Formation. The age of the Formation has been revised in the following hundred years, with Roland W. Brown (1936) identifying the deposits as being older than the Latah Formation. In a later written communication circa 1958, Brown again revised the age still older, stating the fossils found in the area of Mount Elizabeth indicated an Oligocene age. This age was used by Parker and Calkins (1964) for work on the Curlew Quadrangle of Ferry County.

Lithology 
Parker and Calkins (1964) noted the association of the Klondike Mountain Formation with the gold and silver deposits of the Republic District and suggested it as a potential host to more ore deposits in the Curlew Quadrangle.  The epithermal gold deposits occurring in the Sanpoil volcanics terminate directly below the unconformity where the volcanics contact the base of the Klondike Mountain Formation or sometimes penetrate into the Formation's lowest unit. Hydrothermal sinter deposits are known from the lowest portions of the Formation and are thought to represent hydrothermal eruption areas.  In general the lower portions of the Formation have a large amount of hydrothermal alteration, and areas around vents are rich in pyrite and silica. two products of natural hydrothermic sintering.  The areas above that show a transition to mudstones, siltstones and sandstones grading from fine-grained material into coarser materials moving up the strata column. The finely-bedded stones show the greatest numbers of fossils and the finest preservation of details.

Paleoenvironment and paleoclimate 
The lake bed sediments preserve a diverse array of plants, insects, and fishes, notably the biota called the Republic flora.  The Okanagan lake system, which includes the Klondike Mountain Formation, has been classified as one of the great Canadian lagerstätten.  The area likely had a mesic upper microthermal to lower mesothermal climate, in which winter temperatures rarely dropped low enough for snow, and which were seasonably equitable.

The Okanagan highlands paleoforest surrounding the lakes have been described as precursors to the modern Temperate broadleaf and mixed forests of Eastern North America and Eastern Asia. Based on the fossil biotas the lakes were higher and cooler then the coeval coastal forests preserved in the Puget Group and Chuckanut Formation of Western Washington, which are described as lowland tropical forest ecosystems. Estimates of the paleoelevation between  higher than the coastal forests.

Estimates of the mean annual temperature have been derived from Climate leaf analysis multivariate program (CLAMP) and leaf margin analysis (LMA) of the Republic paleoflora.

Paleobiota
The formation is host to a highly diverse assemblage of plants and insects including some of the last records of taxa before extinction and the first appearances of taxa.

Bryophytes
Dillhoff et al. (2013) reference undescribed moss specimens known from the Klondike Mountain Formation known from vegetative gametophytes and they noted them to be similar to undescribed specimens from the Allenby Formation and Horsefly shales.

Lycophytes
Rare specimens of Selaginella fossils were noted by Wehr (1998), with no species level description.

Pteridophytes

Gymnosperms
Three major groups of gymnosperms are present in the Klondike Mountain Formation, with the most speciose being the pinophytes.  The ginkgophytes are represented by two species pf Ginkgo, while an undescribed Zamiaceae member is the sole cycadophyte.

Cycadophytes

Gingkophytes

Pinophytes

Flowering plants 
Angiosperms, commonly called flowering plants belong to a single plant clade which diverged from other plants during the prior to the Cretaceous, and began to rapidly evolve and radiate by the Middle Cretaceous.  Angiosperm diversification during the Cretaceous and Paleocene resulted in eight recognized clades that are segregated into two groups the Basal angiosperms and Core angiosperms.  Present in the Klondike Mountain Formation are four of the eight groups, Nymphaeales representing Basal Angiosperms, plus Magnoliids, Monocots, and Eudicots all in the Core angiosperms.

Nymphaeales
The Basal Angiosperms are represented by a single Nymphaeales water-lily species Nuphar carlquistii, though a second member, Allenbya collinsonae, has been described from the Princeton Chert.  Wehr (1995) illustrated two fossils that were tentatively identified as fruits of the banana genus Ensete and the extinct myrtle genus Paleomyrtinaea respectively, however further fossil finds resulted in the re-identification of the first as a N. carlquistii rhizome section, and the second is a seed mass from the same water-lily.

Magnoliids
Under the APG IV system of flowering plant classification, the magnoliids are divided into four orders Canellales, Laurales, Magnoliales, and Piperales.  Member species and undescribed taxa placed confidently in the Laurales and Magnoliales are present in the formation.  The laurales are the most diverse magnoliid order of the formation with one described species Sassafras hesperia plus three tentatively identified genera which have not been described. Of the magnoliales, only an undescribed Magnolia, having possible affinity with Magnolia subg. Talauma, is found in the formation, while Liriodendroxylon princetonensis has described from permineralized wood in the Princeton Chert.  The extinct angiosperm genus Dillhoffia has noted similarities to the piperalean family Aristolochiaceae, but was left incertae sedis as to family by Manchester and Pigg (2008) due to a lack of confident morphological characters for placement.  Piperales are known from the Princeton chert, with Saururus tuckerae representing the oldest confident Saururaceae species in the fossil record.

Monocots
The second largest clade of flowering plants, monocots are divided into eleven separate orders and of those, the Alismatales, Asparagales, Liliales, and Poales are found in the Klondike Mountain Formation, each represented by a single taxon.  The Alismatales are represented by the Araceae species Orontium wolfei, which is considered similar to the modern golden clubs of eastern North America, while the extinct Paleoallium belongs to the Liliales.  Asparagales and Poales are both present as undescribed species associated with the genera Smilax and Typha respectively.  Extinct genera of monocots are also represented in the Princeton chert by the arecalean palm Uhlia, the alismatalean genus Heleophyton, the alismatalean Keratosperma, the asparagalean pollen morphogenus Pararisteapollis, the lilialean genus Soleredera, and the poalean genus Ethela,

Eudicots

Over a dozen different Rosaceae genera, both extant and extinct, have been identified in the formation providing some of the oldest reliable macrofossil records (excluding fossil pollen) for the family.  Benedict et al. (2011) described first fossils for the prunoid genus Oemleria along with the oldest Prunus flowers.  The Prunus flowers are complemented by leaf fossils representing five to six distinct morphotypes. Spiraea is known from an inflorescence with multiple flowers and leaves that are either from the genus or a closely related extinct type. The leaves frequently are preserved with a persistent stipule, a feature not found in modern Spiraea species. The firethorn genus Pyracantha and the South American genus Hesperomeles have been tentatively identified from leaves while Maloidea leaves belonging to either Malus or Pyrus have been found.  Two distinct species of the Asian endemic genus Photinia are known, however only on of them Photinia pagae had been described as of 2007.  The rosaceous genus Physocarpus had been reported by Hopkins and Wehr (1994) as also occurring in the formation, however subsequent examination of the fossils by Oh & Potter (2005) failed to find stellate trichomes which are a distinct feature of the genus. They noted the fossils might be stem Neillieae, the rose tribe containing both Physocarpus and Neillia, or possibly Rubus, Crataegus, or Ribes.

Fossils of both Sorbus and Rhus species leaves showing evidence of being interspecies hybrids have been noted from the formation and Flynn, DeVore and Pigg (2019) described four species of sumac which formed multiple hybrids.  Between three and four Trochodendraceae species that have been described from the Klondike Mountain Formation.  Broadly circumscribed four species in three genera have been identified at Republic, Paraconcavistylon wehrii, Pentacentron sternhartae, Tetracentron hopkinsii, and Trochodendron nastae. Additionally the species Trochodendron drachukii is known from related Kamloops group shales at the McAbee Fossil Beds near Cache Creek, British Columbia.  Manchester et al. 2018 noted that Tr. drachukii is likely the fruits of  Tr. nastae, while Pe. sternhartae are likely the fruits of Te. hopkinsii.  If fossils of the fruits and foliage in attachment are found, that would bring the species count down to three whole plant taxa.  Additionally, the extinct genus Nordenskioldia is also known from the formation.  The placement of Nordenskioldia is debated, with some treatments placing it into Trochodendraceae, while a 2020 analysis placed it outside of the crown-group Trochodendaceae. Wesley Wehr in 1994 reported Bignoniaceae seeds along with a single Rubiaceae fruit and an isolated Fabaceae leaf. An update of the floral list by Wehr and Manchester published in 1996 added an additional fifteen taxa identified from reproductive structures such as flowers fruits or seeds.

Pigg, Manchester, and Wehr (2003) noted in during the description of Corylus johnsonii and Carpinus perryae that they were the oldest confirmed hazelnut and hornbeam fossils. That status was affirmed by Forest et al. (2005) who used both as fossil calibration points for phylogenetic analysis of Betulaceae.

Arthropods
The insect fauna of the Klondike Mountain Formation includes representatives from over 13 orders, based on a 1992 estimate, including immature though adult specimens and both terrestrial and aquatic taxa. The most prevalent orders are Diptera and Hemiptera, each making up approximately 30% of the fossil insects known in 1992.

Blattodea

Coleoptera
A list of Coleopteran families identified by 1992 included Carabidae, Cerambycidae, Chrysomelidae, Curculionidae, Dytiscidae, Elateridae and Lucanidae, but the beetle fauna has not been described in depth yet, with only two weevil species having been fully described. A third beetle group belonging to the bean beetle tribe Pachymerini has been identified as palm beetles of the Caryobruchus–Speciomerus genus group.

Dermaptera
The order Dermaptera was first reported in 1992 and is known from a series of isolated partial specimens, mostly abdominal sections with the distinct anal forceps attached. Based on the forceps structuring the specimens were tentatively assigned to the modern family Forficulidae, as the oldest North American representatives of the family known at that time.

Diptera

Ephemeroptera
Lewis (1992) listed one species of Heptageniidae mayflies and three specimens that he did not place to family. The Heptageniidae specimen was later described as a squaregill mayfly by Sinitchenkova (1999) and the oldest member of the genus Neoephemera.

Hemiptera

Hymenoptera
A review of the Okanagan highlands hymenoptera published in 2018 identified four "Symphyta" families in the formation Cimbicidae, Pamphiliidae, Siricidae, and Tenthredinidae.  Of the "Apocrita" families thirteen are represented, the "Parasitica" families are Braconidae, Diapriidae Ichneumonidae, Proctotrupidae, and Roproniidae while the Vespoidea families are Formicidae, Pompilidae, Scoliidae and Vespidae.  Within Apoidea the "Spheciformes" families include Angarosphecidae and Sphecidae while Halictidae is the sole "Apiformes" family known from body fossils.  Prunus and Ulmus leaves have been found having damage that is consistent with the damage pattern left by Megachilidae species bees when they remove sections of tissue for nest lining.  There are several additional Apoidea fossils that were left as incertae sedis in the group based on the similarity between them and Paleorhopalosoma menatensis, a Paleocene species described from the Menat Formation Auvergne, France. The placement of P. menatensis is uncertain, having been initially described as a member of Rhopalosomatidae, but is possibly an Angarosphecidae or closely related taxon, based on the wing and body morphology.

Lepidoptera
A solitary lepidopteran fossil has been recovered, but no full descriptive work has been made on the specimen, aside from a single PhD dissertation. Early examination placed the moth in the family Geometridae, but later work has identified it as the oldest member of the tiger moth subfamily Arctiinae.

Mecoptera
A number of mecopteran species belonging to the families Cimbrophlebiidae, Dinopanorpidae, Eorpidae, and Panorpidae are also known.

Neuroptera
The neuropteran insects (lacewings and their allies) identified as of 2014 include species from the families Berothidae, Chrysopidae, Hemerobiidae, Ithonidae (including Polystoechotidae), Nymphidae, Osmylidae, and Psychopsidae.

Odonata

Orthoptera

Phasmatodea
Fossil wings first described in 2015 were identified as being from Susumanioidea stick-insects, a group that had previously been known from the Jurassic to the Paleocene only. Archibald and Bradler (2015) did not place Eoprephasma into Susumaniidae family, maintaining that known characters of the describe specimens did not match taxa in the family, they instead kept the genus as Susumanioidea incertae sedis.  Phylogenetic analysis of Susumanioidea published by Yang et al. (2021) resulted in placement of Eoprephasma as the sister group to Renphasma deep within the Susumaniidae subfamily Susumaniinae.  The phylogeny produced by Yang et al. indicated a sister group state with the Cretaceous genus Renphasma of China, and placed both as the most derived of the Susumaniinae taxa.

Raphidioptera

Trichoptera
Trichopterans are known mainly from laraval cases and occasional isolated wings.

Vertebrates
Five species of fish have been identified from the formation, four of which are known from skeletal elements, while the fifth is only known from isolated scales. Of the five species, two are unique to the formation, Hiodon woodruffi and Libotonius pearsoni were both described by paleoichthyologist Mark V. H. Wilson in 1978 and 1979 respectively. The other three species, "Amia" hesperia, Amyzon aggregatum, and Eosalmo driftwoodensis, were first described from Okanagan Highlands formations in British Columbia and subsequently also identified from Ferry County fossils. The first notation of fish fossils in the Republic area was by Joseph Umpleby in his 1910 visit to the area, who collected fish near the Tom Thumb Mine, and sent them to the National Museum of Natural History. After examining the fossils, Charles R. Eastman listed the specimens as belonging to the extinct species Amyzon brevipinne in his Fossil fishes in the collection of the United States National Museum.  Research tapered off until a series of fish were collected in the Toroda Creek Graben northwest of Republic by R. C. Pearson during his compilation of the Geologic map of the Bodie Mountain quadrangle, Ferry and Okanogan Counties, Washington. The fossils were tentatively identified by paleoichthyologist David Dunkle as members of the genera Amyzon, Tricophanes, Erismatopterus and an undefined salmonid. Pearson sent almost all of the specimens collected to the Smithsonian, but the fossils were never accessioned into the collections there and are now considered lost. He did retain one fossil from the initial collection which was later donated to the USGS collections. The largest single work on the fish of the Okanagan Highlands was published by Mark Wilson in 1977 and covered fossils collected from the known British Columbian Okanagan Highlands fossil sites of the time.  While not covering the Washington State fossils, Wilson named two of the species that are currently recognized from the Klondike Mountain Formation Amyzon aggregatum and Eosalmo driftwoodensis.  Additionally scales attributed to the genus Amia were discussed and the genus Libotonius was named from fossils in the Allenby Formation. In the late 1960s a collection of fish from near the Tom Thumb Mine in Republic was compiled by resident R. Woodward.  During the summers of 1976 and 1977 the University of Alberta conducted field collecting in both the Republic and Toroda Creek areas, along with the donation of the Woodward collection, yielded a number of fossil catostomids, along with a single percopsid, a salmonid, a hiodontid, and an Amia scale.  The hiodontids were subsequently described as the species Eohiodon woodruffi in 1978 based on differences between the Tom thumb Tuff fossils and those found in British Columbian sites.  A year later the percopsid fossils were also described as Libotonius pearsoni, extending the range of the genus south from the Allenby Formation.

Bird fossils are limited to mostly isolated feathers that are preserved in the finer grained strata of the lake bed, though one partial bird skeleton has also been recovered.

References 

 
Ypresian Stage
Geology of the Rocky Mountains
Paleogene geology of Washington (state)
Paleontology in Washington (state)